Ectoedemia anguinella is a moth of the family Nepticulidae. It was described by James Brackenridge Clemens in 1864. It was described from the US state of Kentucky.

This species has only been known from the original description about the mine and larva feeding on a Quercus species. No type material was preserved. Because the larva is described as having ten square-dark-brown or blackish spots, this suggests that the species belongs to Ectoedemia. The black spots are lost by the time the final stage larva is reached. Therefore, the described mines also possibly also incomplete. The narrow serpentine tract which is filled or discolored throughout its length by black excrement could, in a mature mine, have continued by opening into a blotch.

Clemens' original description corresponds in all points with the juvenile larva of Ectoedemia similella and therefore might be a synonym.

External links
"160098 – 0107 – Ectoedemia anguinella – (Clemens, 1861)". Moth Photographers Group. Mississippi State University. Retrieved November 5, 2017.

Nepticulidae
Moths of North America
Moths described in 1864